Katherine Fugate (born July 14, 1965) is an American film and television writer and producer.

Biography
She graduated with a B.A. in Theatre Arts and a minor in Journalism from University of California, Riverside. Fugate and her aunt, the actress Barbara Eden, are direct descendants of Benjamin Franklin. Her cousin was the late Matthew Ansara, son of Barbara Eden.

Career

Fugate will make her feature directorial debut on the movie Christy Martin based on her script.

Fugate is the creator and executive producer of the TV series, Army Wives.

Fugate is a frequent guest on The Stephanie Miller Show on Sirius XM: Progress, often speaking out on racism, domestic violence and bigotry. She is the leader of "First They Came," an activist group and member of the Action Group Network standing up for equality and fairness for all. She appears on the show alone and also with her daughter, Madeleine, who is referred to as the Official Child Pundit of The Stephanie Miller Show.

Her piece on growing up with domestic violence and the link of domestic abuse to mass shootings was documented in "Nobody Would Have Been Surprised If I Had Died" and earned a spot on "Sports Illustrateds Best of Journalism, 2017" list. Prior to that, she wrote "When The Racist Is Someone You Know And Love," which was translated into several languages and recorded into a podcast, and "White People Are Broken" about systemic racism. All her pieces can be found on Medium.com.

She also wrote the screenplays for the  2010 film Valentine's Day and the 2011 follow-up, New Year's Eve. Both films were directed by Garry Marshall and featured all-star ensemble casts.

Fugate has been an active leader in the Writers Guild of America (WGA) for a number of years. She was a strike captain in the 2007-2008 Writers Guild of America strike, then won a two-year seat on the Board of Directors for the WGA, West (WGAw) in 2008.  Fugate was re-elected to the WGAw Board of Directors in 2010, 2012, and 2014.

In 2008, she created The Writers Fund, an anonymous group of WGA writers who financially help other WGA writers in times of need.

She was a member of the 2011 WGA Negotiating Committee.

In 2011, Fugate was invited to the White House to participate in the "Joining Forces" military family awareness campaign of First Lady Michelle Obama and Second Lady Jill Biden.  She hosted an event starring Mrs. Obama at the Writers Guild Theatre to further shine a light on military issues to the entertainment community.  She has appeared on MSNBC, CNN and numerous radio shows and talks shows concerning posttraumatic stress disorder and other struggles of the military.

She wrote a pro bono script for a Public Service Announcement starring Steven Spielberg and directed by Joanna Kerns.

She is a member of the Academy of Television Arts & Sciences.

In 2012, she was elected to the Western Council of the Actors Fund, a non-profit industry-wide charity.

Article on Fugate in the February/March 2015 Awards Issue of "Written By" Magazine, discussing the realities of being a female screenwriter in Hollywood, "Can Feminist Values Save Hollywood?"

As a board member, Fugate created a series of philosophical discussions on the impact the images created on screen in Film and TV have on real life events. The topics have included Violence In The Media, the Treatment of Women: On and Off Screen and Race In America: On and Off Screen.

Awards and honorable recognitions
The Republique of France and La Ministre de la Culture awarded Madame Katherine Fugate with the distinction of "Commandeur de L'Order des Arts et des Lettres," in Paris, 31 Mai 2018

She received a Gracie Allen Award and a WIN Award for Army Wives, Season 1.

In 2012, she received the Visionary Award for the strong portrayal of female characters in film and television.

She was voted one of Variety magazine's Women of Impact, 2008.

She was chosen by Film France as one of the top 10 screenwriters (Valentine's Day) in September, 2010 and invited to France for the France Unlimited Access program.

Personal life
Katherine Fugate has never been married. She has been linked with both men and women. She is a single mom and has one child, daughter Madeleine Barbara (born 2006). She is a devoted fan of the New Orleans Saints and brought the team's co-owner, Rita Benson LeBlanc, to the New Year's Eve premiere.  Fugate was an invited guest on the Krewe of Orpheus float in the Mardi Gras parade, 2011. She was featured in a 2013 episode of House Hunters International titled "Every Little Girl's Dream Comes True in Paris."

Screenwriting credits

Television
Max Steel (2000)
Xena: Warrior Princess (2001)
Army Wives (2007-2008)

Films
 Kounterfeit (1996)
 Carolina (2003)
 The Prince & Me (2004)
 Valentine’s Day (2010)
 New Year’s Eve (2011)
 A Killer Among Us (2012)
 How Could You Do This to Me (2018)
 Christy Martin (TBA)

References

External links
 
 

1965 births
Living people
American television producers
American women television producers
American television writers
University of California, Riverside alumni
American women screenwriters
American women television writers
Place of birth missing (living people)
21st-century American women